The 1947 Tour de Suisse was the 11th edition of the Tour de Suisse cycle race and was held from 16 August to 23 August 1947. The race started and finished in Zürich. The race was won by Gino Bartali.

General classification

References

1947
Tour de Suisse